Afytos (Greek, Modern: Άφυτος) is a village in Chalkidiki, northern Greece. It is part of the municipality Kassandra. It is situated on the northeastern coast of the Kassandra peninsula, 6 km northeast of Kassandreia, 31 km south of Polygyros and 73 km southeast of Thessaloniki. In 2011 its population was 1,273.  Its elevation is 50 m. The area around Afytos consists of farmlands in low hills. Its economy is based on agriculture and tourism. Its folklore museum was founded in 1980 by the folklore councillor Nikos Paralis. The town  attracts tourists mainly from the surrounding region due to its beaches and local craft markets.  The museum is located in the building of the Alevras family. Councils and clubs include the Folklore Friendship Council and Afytos Tradition.

Population

History

Ancient Aphytis was an important town, belonging to Pallene. Its fleet participated in the Persian Wars. The town declined, and was not mentioned again until the 14th century. During the Greek War of Independence, many revolutionaries came from the village, including Triantafyllos Garoufallou, Georgios Panagiotou and Anastassios Kiriazis. Tourism rose after World War II.

References

Sources
Tourist Directory, Central and Western Macedonia, Explorer, 2003

External links

Chaklidiki at the GTP Travel Pages

Populated places in Chalkidiki